The 2016 Crescent Women World Cup Vårgårda Team time trial was the ninth edition of the now famous women's team time trial event - the Vårgårda Team time trial. It also featured as the 14th round of the 2016 UCI Women's WorldTour.

Results

References

Open de Suède Vårgårda
Crescent Vargarda
Crescent Vargarda
Crescent Vargarda